Kohistan District (Šahrestâne Kuhistân) is one of the 29 districts of Badakhshan province in eastern Afghanistan.  It was created in 1995 from part of Ragh District and is home to approximately 18,410 residents. The provincial capital Kohistan District is the Pas-Pel village.

References

External links
Map at the Afghanistan Information Management Services

Districts of Badakhshan Province